Lone Journey: The Life of Roger Williams is a biography of Roger Williams, champion of religious freedom and founder of Providence Plantation, written for children by Jeanette Eaton. First published in 1944, it was illustrated with full-page woodcuts by Woodi Ishmael. The book was a Newbery Honor recipient in 1945.

References

1944 children's books
American children's books
American biographies
Newbery Honor-winning works
Children's history books
Harcourt (publisher) books